The Depository Institutions Deregulation and Monetary Control Act of 1980 (often abbreviated DIDMCA or MCA) is a United States federal financial statute passed in 1980 and signed by President Jimmy Carter on March 31.  It gave the Federal Reserve greater control over non-member banks.

 It forced all banks to abide by the Fed's rules.
 It relaxed the rules under which national banks could merge.
 It removed the power of the Federal Reserve Board of Governors under the Glass–Steagall Act to use Regulation Q to set maximum interest rates for any deposit accounts other than demand deposit accounts (with a six-year phase-out).
 It allowed Negotiable Order of Withdrawal accounts to be offered nationwide.
 It raised the deposit insurance of US banks and credit unions from $40,000 to $100,000.
 It allowed credit unions and savings and loans to offer checkable deposits.
 It allowed institutions to charge any loan interest rates they chose.

The act was in part a response to economic volatility and financial innovations of the 1970s that increasingly pressed the highly regulated savings and loan industry and arguably had unintended consequences that helped lead to the collapse and subsequent bailout of that financial sector.  While S&Ls were freed to pay depositors higher interest rates, the institutions continued to carry large portfolios of loans paying them much lower rates of return; by 1981, 85 percent of the thrifts were losing money and the congressional response was the Garn–St Germain Depository Institutions Act of 1982.

The bill's passage is considered an important shift in the Democratic Party's positioning on economic regulation, as the party had historically defended New Deal era financial regulations, but had now come to favor financial deregulation. According to a 2022 study, this shift happened as a consequence of the congressional reforms of the 1970s, which undermined parochial and Southern populist interests within the Democratic Party. These parochial and populist interests favored a decentralized banking system. The party subsequently pursued deregulatory reforms that it perceived as beneficial to savers and consumers.

References

Further reading

External links

FDIC page on act
Public Law 96-221, 96th Congress, H.R. 4986: Depository Institutions Deregulation and Monetary Control Act of 1980

1980 in law
Federal Reserve System
United States federal banking legislation
Federal Deposit Insurance Corporation
Savings and loan crisis